Matucana intertexta is a species of cactus in the genus Matucana, native to Peru. It has gained the Royal Horticultural Society's Award of Garden Merit.

Subspecies
The following subspecies are currently accepted:
Matucana intertexta subsp. intertexta
Matucana intertexta subsp. jankei Cieza & Pino

References

Trichocereeae
Endemic flora of Peru
Plants described in 1963